Acmosara is a genus of moths of the family Yponomeutidae.

Species
Acmosara polyxena - Meyrick, 1886 

Yponomeutidae